The following is a list of characters in the Ronin Warriors manga and anime series authored by Hajime Yatate.

Protagonists

Ryo Sanada

Voiced by Takeshi Kusao (Japanese), Matt Hill (English)

 is the unofficial leader of the Ronin Warriors who is often accompanied by the large white tiger, . Known to be brash and impulsive at times, he is nonetheless goodhearted and fiercely loyal. A tenacious warrior, Ryo was the first of the five rōnin to arrive in Shinjuku to confront the forces of the Evil Dynasty during their first invasion. He was also the first to be rescued by companions Mia and Ully after their initial siege on Talpa's castle.

Though they manage to regroup and defeat Talpa, the Evil Dynasty resurfaced and captured Ryo's fellow rōnin Sage, Kento and Cye. With his only remaining comrade, Rowen, Ryo ventures into the Nether Realm with Mia and Ully to rescue their fellow warriors, ultimately vanquishing Talpa in one final battle.

As owner of this armor, Ryo inherits the title . When equipped, Ryo becomes immune to the effects of extreme heat and flames.

Ryo later acquires the white , which requires the additional energies of four other armors to summon. Wielding this armor proved a great challenge for Ryo until he acquired the twin  from the Nether Realm warlord, Lord Sabrestryke. Ryo’s transformation call is Armor of Wildfire, Tao-Jin. In Japanese, Ryo called .

Following the battle with Mukala and the Black Inferno Armor, the White Inferno and Wildfire armors were destroyed. Ryo would later acquire new armor from the spirit Suzunagi; though the nature and abilities of this new armor were never explored.

Ryo comes from the ninja school of the Sanada Ten Braves, a legendary band of ninja who were believed to have assisted Sanada Yukimura, a real samurai who died in 1615. He is frequently depicted as wearing red armor, and is widely considered a hero. The crest on Ryo's armor is actually a slightly stylized version the family symbol of the Takeda clan. In a Newtype poll, Ryo ranked #17 for the top 30 most popular male anime character from the 1980s.

In the English dub of the original 39 episodes, his name is pronounced "RYE-oh." But in the dub of the OVA episodes, it's pronounced "REE-oh" which is closer to the original Japanese, though inconsistent with earlier dub episodes.

Kento Rei Fang

Voiced by: Tomohiro Nishimura (Japanese), Jason Gray-Stanford (English, TV), Andrew Francis (English, OVA)

It is said to be the most violent of the armors. His rival is Dais, the Dark Warlord of Illusion.

When the Ancient One sent Kento to Mt. Aso (Mt Daisetsu in Japanese version) to unlock his Armor's true power, Dais followed him with the Sand Strikers. Kento defeated them by learning to focus his power. Kento’s transformation call is Armor of Hardrock, Tao-Gi. In Japanese, Xiu called .

His weapon is a combination of a three-section staff and a naginata which he sometimes wields like a pair of nunchakus in close combat. Kento gains a new suit of Armor in the 3rd OVA, Message, but its powers and abilities are unknown.

Kento is a descendant of a martial artist who came to Japan long ago from China. Kento’s family own a Chinese restaurant in Chinatown, Yokohama.

Sage Date

Voiced by: Daiki Nakamura (Japanese), Michael Donovan (English, TV), Matt Smith (English, OVA)

In the English dub of the series, his guiding virtue is Chi (Wisdom). His rival is Cale, the Dark Warlord of Corruption. He is considered the most mature and aloof member of the team.

When the Ancient One sends him to the Catasota Gulch Pinnacles (Akiyoshidai Plateau in Yamaguchi Prefecture in Japanese version) to unlock his armor's true power, Sage realized the armors can be used for good or evil. He speaks formally in the original "Samurai Troopers" series. Sage’s transformation call is Armor of Halo, Tao-Chi. In Japanese, Seiji called .

Sage fights with a nodachi, a Japanese broadsword.

Sage is captured by Shikaiden and the Mad Scientist in the OVA Gaiden. His Armor of Halo is used to kill people in New York, including Runa's brother. Sage gains a new armor in the last OVA, Message, but its abilities are unknown.

Sage's family name, Date, comes from a real-life samurai called Date Masamune. Date Masamune is famous for being blind in one eye, and has the nickname "The One-Eyed Dragon." As an intentional nod to this, Sage's hair is styled so that his bangs always cover one eye.

Cye Mori

Voiced by: Nozomu Sasaki (Japanese), Michael Donovan (English)

In OVA, Shin as Trust, or a Faith. His rival is Sekhmet, the Dark Warlord of Venom. He is the oldest member of the Warriors and one of the calmest.

When the Ancient One sent him to the Sea of Toyama (Naruto Strait in Japanese version) to unlock his armor's true power, he encountered a clone of himself called Red Torrent. He defeated the clone by purifying the water around himself, which strengthened him. He speaks with an English accent in the English dub. Cye’s transformation call is Armor of Torrent, Tao-Shin. In Japanese, Shin calls .

His weapon is a Jūmonji yari, whose prongs can close, allowing him to grab opponents from afar or cut through obstacles. The armor is also equipped with a tantō dagger and a claw-like weapon on the gauntlet, but he has, apparently, never used either of those. In the 3rd OVA, Message, Cye receives a new suit of Armor, but its abilities are unknown.

According to Cye, his family is said to be descendants of the real-life Japanese daimyo Mouri Motonari.

Rowen Hashiba

Voiced by: Hiroshi Takemura (Japanese), Ward Perry (English)

He often acts as a voice of reason to Ryo and Kento's hotter tempers. Rowen is close friends with Sage, as they share similar interests. He and Kento are childhood friends, having met through Kento's paternal grandfather. He is said to have an IQ of 250, making him the most intelligent of the Ronin Warriors. His enemy is Anubis, the Darklord of Cruelty.

Rowen was the only Ronin not found in a Japanese landmark; but in space instead. 

Rowen’s transformation call is Armor of Strata, Tao-Inochi. In Japanese, Touma calls .

His weapon is a collapsible, golden bow and a small, back-mounted quiver which supplies an virtually endless amount of arrows. Rowen has demonstrated great expertise using this weapon and displayed exceptional marksmanship

(The first use of which demolished a large section of a mountain). Other abilities include Rowen can erect protective barriers of around himself to slow his descent. Rowen gains a new suit of Armor in the third OVA, Message, but its powers are unknown.

The English dub of the series gives him a thick Brooklyn accent, but that went missing in the OVAs.

Rowen's name Hashiba is most likely from Toyotomi Hideyoshi's original surname, Hashiba. Toyotomi was Oda Nobunaga's successor, and unified Japan under his rule for a short while. This can be backed up by Rowen’s claim that he follows the way of the Taiko Kampaku school. A retired Kampaku (which is both a first secretary and regent to an adult Emperor) was called a taiko and this usually referred to Toyotomi Hideyoshi

Antagonists

Talpa

Voiced by: Shigezō Sasaoka (Japanese), Mina E. Mina (English)

He was defeated by the Ancient One during his first attempt to conquer Earth a thousand years earlier. Talpa's spirit was banished to the Nether Realm while his armor remained on Earth. Since the armor could not be destroyed, the Ancient One split it apart into nine separate armors with their own powers and virtues. Talpa re-acquired four of them, Cruelty, Corruption, Illusion, and Venom, and gave them to four humans who became his Dark Warlords.

When Talpa returns in the modern era, he takes over the city of Tokyo and captures its citizens. Initially appearing as a giant ghostly helmet, Talpa sent the Dark Warlords to do his bidding. He eventually confronts the Warriors and absorbs them along with the Warlords to regain his physical form. He was vanquished by the newly created Armor of Inferno and was assumed to be destroyed. He later returned, along with his trump-card, Lady Kayura, to gain the Armor of Inferno for himself. He nearly succeeded in absorbing all nine armors, but was thwarted by Anubis' sacrifice. In the final battle, he overwhelmed Ryo, who wore the Armor of Inferno, but was destroyed by the Jewel of Life.

Talpa's weapons are six double-edged swords formed in a circle on his back.

Anubis

Voiced by: Kiyoyuki Yanada (Japanese), Paul Dobson (English)

Four hundred years ago, he was a warrior named ,  whose ambition and blood-lust made him susceptible to Talpa's influence.

He was the first of the Warlords to fight the Warriors in modern times. He nearly defeated them until the Ancient One intervened. He later appeared to stop Mia and Ully from saving Ryo, and then to stop Ryo from saving Rowen. When he challenged Ryo and Rowen to a battle, he defeated them but could not bring himself to destroy them. Rowen shattered his mask with an Arrow Shockwave, exposing his human face to them. Talpa sensed that Anubis was showing weakness and used Nether Spirits to turn his mind back to the Dynasty. Anubis was saved when Kento defeated the Nether Spirits. The Ancient One then showed Anubis how Talpa regarded him as a tool. Anubis then renounced the Dynasty.

Anubis disappeared after Talpa's first defeat, but he later returned to take on the Ancient One's role as protector. While the Warriors initially distrusted him, Anubis proved himself by aiding them in battle, usually by helping Ryo summon the Inferno Armor. He also met Lady Kayura, whom he recognized as the last living member of the Ancient One's clan and sought to redeem her. He sacrifices himself to free her from the control of Lord Badamon; before his death, he passed on his armor and the Ancient One's staff to her.

Its guiding virtue is Chū (忠, Loyalty).

Anubis' Japanese name, Shutendōji, is a reference to a demon from Japanese folklore, notable for hating beans (as did the YST version of the character).

Cale
Voiced by: Yasunori Matsumoto (Japanese), Richard Newman, Peter Wilds (Episode 2 Only), Scott McNeil (Episodes 31, 32 and 35; uncredited) (English)

He has powers over darkness. He primarily fights Sage of the Halo, who controls light. His armor of Darkness-Corruption/ represents Winter and the guiding virtue Kou (考, filial piety), which is changed to Tei (Obedience) in the English dub. His weapons are a Nodachi and claw-like armor spikes.

According to The Encyclopedia of YST, if Cale was to use his powers for good, he would be the Eyes for people lost in the darkness. No matter how powerful his enemies may be, he will be persistent and continue to fight.

Dais

Voiced by: Jūrōta Kosugi (Japanese), Matt Smith and Peter Wilds (Episode 2 Only) (English)

His main opponent is Kento Rei Faun. Dais was the first of the Warlords to confront Anubis when he re-emerged. Anubis tried to sway Dais from evil, but Dais stayed with the Dynasty until Talpa was destroyed for good. His Armor of Illusion/ represents Summer and the guiding virtue Nin (忍, lit. "to endure"), which is rendered as "Serenity" in the English dub. It has six Kamas on its back resembling spider legs, which he can extend to any length he sees fit. The Kamas are connected to a single handle attached to his back, which he can remove at any time. He also has a flail on his right gauntlet and a nunchaku on his left. His armor allows him to spin webs and create illusions.

According to The Encyclopedia of YST if Dais were to use his powers for good, he would be able to create peaceful illusions.

Sekhmet

Voiced by: Issei Futamata (Japanese), Ward Perry (English)

He has pale skin, purple eyelids, and beady black eyes. He is Cye Mouri's main opponent. His armor is the Armor of the Venom/, which represents Autumn and the guiding virtue Tei (梯, Obedience), which is changed to Kou (Piety) in the English dub.

Sekhmet fights with six katanas, which exude a deadly poison that can also cause blindness. He can also move his arms at speeds that allow him to seemingly grow four extra arms.

According to The Encyclopedia of YST, if Sekhmet were to use his powers for good, he would be able to heal injuries and illnesses. He would also be able to turn venom into medicine.

Lady Kayura

Voiced by: Masako Katsuki (Japanese), Jane Perry (English)

 is the last known member of the Ancient One's clan. For this reason, she was abducted from her home by the Dynasty at a young age. Talpa kept Kayura under his control with a magical amulet worn around her neck and raised her to be his ultimate weapon against the Ronin Warriors. In her first appearance, she battled Ryo and Rowen while the others were captured by the Dynasty. The Warriors were no match for her until Anubis appeared and summoned the Inferno Armor. Ryo and Rowen faced her several times during their quest through the Nether Realm, and were always at a disadvantage unless they could use the other Warlords' armors to summon the Inferno.

When Ryo inadvertently destroyed Kayura's amulet, she remembered her past and ultimately rejected Talpa's control. At Talpa's behest, Badamon, the leader of the Nether Spirits, possessed Kayura's body to keep her evil. This time, Badamon-Kayura conquered the White Armor's near infinite power. She nearly gained control of the Jewel of Life before White Blaze made a last second swipe at her to force her to drop it to dodge his attack. Kayura was ultimately released from Badamon's control by Anubis's sacrifice, turning the energy from her own surekill attack back on her which, combined with Anubis' armor, shattered Badamon's possession of Kayura, expelling him from her permanently, and putting her back on the side of good. Kayura took up the Ancient One's staff and Anubis's armor to help fight Talpa in the final battle. After Talpa's ultimate destruction, Kayura and the Warlords returned to the Nether Realm to help rebuild the Dynasty into a benevolent empire.

Kayura is several centuries old, though her physical age is 12 according to official publications. She possesses near-infinite supernatural powers, due to her ancestry as a member of the Clan of the Ancients. She wields the twin sai she called Starlight Swords. Her surekill is called , which summons a massive barrage of stellar energy from the sky. Apparently, the attack had some dependency on water, as she never seemed to use it unless a considerable amount was present. Kayura was also given Anubis' Cruelty armor, and gained the Ancient One's staff, but whether she used them afterwards or not is in question. Because of her new role, Kayura should be referred to as the Ancient One.

In the YST manga, Kayura's Virtue is "ai" (愛, love). In the Shin Yoroiden Samurai Troopers manga, Kayura serves as the mentor to the new wearer of the Armor of Wildfire. She also appears in the YST novel, Shinkon-Hen, which is about the history of the Ancient One's clan.

Dynasty Soldiers

Voiced by: Minoru Inaba (Japanese), Matt Smith (English)

 are spirits trapped within suits of dark green armor who serve Lord Talpa. They are sometimes known as "Soldiers of Doom." They wield various weapons, including chained sickles and spears. The only way to kill a Dynasty Soldier is to decapitate it or slice its armor. Dark smoke rising from the Soldier's armor signifies its death.

The Dynasty Soldiers were initially difficult adversaries for the Warriors. As the Warriors grew stronger, they were able to handle them easier. Their fate after Talpa's final defeat is unknown.

There are no Dynasty Soldiers in the original video animations (OVA). Shikaisen, the main villain of Gaiden, uses Ninja, while both Mukala and Suzunagi of The Legend of the Inferno Armor and Message, respectively, did not use lackeys. The Dynasty Soldiers do not appear in the manga; instead, they are replaced by more appearances of the Dark Warlords and their creatures.

Badamon

Voiced by: Yoshiya Nemoto (Japanese)

 is the Lord of Talpa's Nether Spirits. He's a willing follower of Talpa and is aware of his plans. Badamon first appears to explain the power of the Inferno armor to the Dark Warlords. He decides to trick Ryo into using the Warlords' armor to form Inferno in a plan to control him, but that fails when Ryo's will proves too strong. Badamon later sends the warrior Gash to stop Mia, Ully and Anubis from finding the Jewel of Life. He last appears when he possesses Lady Kayura to keep her under Talpa's control. He captures the Warriors and Warlords and attempts to use their armor to open a gate to the Nether Realm. Anubis, however, breaks free and sacrifices himself to drive Badamon away from Kayura. During the final battle, Badamon and his spirits succeed in opening the door to the Human World, but he's destroyed by Ryo in the Inferno Armor.

Supporting characters

The Ancient One

Voiced by: Norio Wakamoto (Japanese), David Kaye (English)

He created the nine mystical armors from Talpa's discarded armor. He acts as the Ronin Warriors' mentor during their battle with Talpa. He also helped Anubis defect from Talpa by showing him how Talpa regarded him as a tool.

The Ancient One was mortally wounded in battle by Talpa, but as a last act, turned himself into the Warriors' bridge to Talpa's castle. He continued to assist the Warriors in spirit form by destroying Talpa's Nether Spirits and sending the Warriors on quests to unlock their armors' true power. After his death, his role as protector was inherited by Anubis and then by his last living descendant, Lady Kayura.

He always wears a straw hat which hides his face and usually carries a shakujo, a staff with ring-shaped chimes set atop it. The staff is a potent talisman, and is used by both the Ancient and the reformed Anubis to perform feats of magic. It is also used briefly by Mia and Ully. In the flashback to the Ancient defeating Talpa in episode 19 ("Wildfire's Fight Against Fate"), it is revealed that the gold part can be removed from its base and be used as a sword as well, although this has only been seen in the flashback.

The Ancient One's last appearance was in the 3rd OVA, Message. In flashbacks, the Ancient One discovered the sealed Armor of Strata and the ghost-child Suzunagi during World War II. He sensed the girl was filled with hatred and revenge, and felt sorry for her. Nevertheless, he was forced to use the Armor of Strata to drive her away when she attacked him.

Mia Koji

Voiced by: Kaori Kusakabe (Japanese), Teryl Rothery (Episode 2 only), Lalainia Lindbjerg, Maggie Blue O'Hara (OVA) (English).

Not much is known about her past, except that she was born in Canada to a French mother and a Japanese father, and was visiting her paternal grandfather when Talpa's invasion began. Unlike her friends, Mia has no super powers or weapons. However, she is extremely knowledgeable about the mystical armors and various ancient artifacts. She provides vital information to the Warriors and acts as a caretaker for Ully. Over time, Mia becomes like an older sister to them. Mia is 17 years old at the start of the TV series. She is 19 in Gaiden and in her early twenties in The Legend of the Inferno Armor and Message.

She helps the Warriors in The Legend of the Inferno Armor by decoding the Taulagi's ancient language to track down Ryo and Sage. Her last appearance is in Message as she attends the special session of the United Nations General Assembly addressing the Nether Realm's activities. Mia told the assembly she had "all the answers [they] need," though the scene cut-away before she spoke further.

Mia's birthday technically falls on two dates, due to an error by Sunrise. According to the YST book, Memorials, her birthday is listed as May 15, 1970; however, all other merchandise lists her birthday on May 28, 1970. The latter date is the more commonly accepted one by both Sunrise and fans.

Mia Koji's Japanese given name, Násti, means "star" in Northern Sámi language while her Japanese surname, Yagyū, is based on the real Japanese clan with the same name. Like most of the characters in the series, many of their family names are based on historical Japanese clans

Mia plays the same role in the manga as she does in the anime version of YST. However, her importance is greatly reduced while Ully and White Blaze become major players.

Mia begins a romantic relationship with Sage.

Ully Yamano

Voiced by: Kumiko Watanabe (Japanese), Christopher Turner (English)

He is eight-years old in the series. The spelling of his name varies (Yulie being the most common of these) but this particular spelling is commonly used in official magazines such as Animerica.

Ully is first introduced shopping with his parents in the Shinjuku ward of Tokyo. When Talpa's invasion begins, Ully is separated from his parents in the chaos. He later stumbles upon a confrontation between Ryo, White Blaze, and a Dynasty Soldier. He is nearly killed but Mia saves him, the first of many rescues he would endure. Since then, he helps the Warriors with his bravery and cheerful optimism.

Ully becomes the keeper of the Jewel of Life during the second season. His purity and innocence allows him to unlock its powers and destroy Talpa for good.

Ully appears in the last episode of the OVA, Message, as an 11-year-old kendo champion of Sakura Hill Junior High School.

White Blaze
 is a large white tiger that's Ryo Sanada's pet or companion. Ryo claims that he comes from the Himalayas. White Blaze generally travels with Ully and Mia Koji. He often tries to help the Warriors in battle, but he almost always gets swatted aside. Nevertheless, he doesn't hesitate to charge into battle. He is mortally wounded protecting Ryo from Lord Saberstryke. After his defeat, Lord Saberstryke asked his own companion tiger, Black Blaze, to revive White Blaze by merging with him. Afterwards, White Blaze would transform into Black Blaze whenever Ryo summons the Armor of Inferno. It's unclear if this Black Blaze is still White Blaze, but using Black Blaze's power, or Black Blaze himself.

Runa

Voiced by: Eriko Hara (credited as Eri Kouno) (Japanese), Jillian Michaels (English)

Runa is a 14-year-old American who lives in New York City. Her only known family member is her older brother. She is a brash and hot-headed young girl who is ready to take action when necessary. She isn't afraid to speak her mind, but she's also willing to admit she's made a mistake.

When her brother is murdered by an unknown killer wearing Sage's Armor of Halo, Runa immediately investigates. The other Ronin Warriors went to New York City to look for Sage. Runa sees Rowen find the body of the photographer who took the first photographs of the killer. She assumed he was the killer, but eventually realized her mistake to help the Warriors track down their real enemy, Shikaisen, and rescue their friends.

Runa tried to avenge her brother's death by attacking Shikaisen. The sorcerer mortally wounds her and she dies in Ryo's arms. In the original Japanese version, her last words to Ryo were inaudible, but in the English dub, she tells Ryo how glad she was to have met him.

Runa showed much interest in Ryo. She was attacked by one of Shikaisen's henchmen in a Los Angeles cemetery, but was saved by Kento. However, she still shouted for Ryo, which bewildered Kento. According to Sunrise, Runa and Ryo would have developed deeper feelings for one another if she had survived the OVA's events.

While Runa doesn't have any magical armor or superpowers, she does use a knife. Under normal circumstances she is pretty skilled at using it, as she was able to catch the Warriors off guard the first time she encountered them in Uncle Chin's restaurant in Chinatown, New York. Her speed is noted to be quite remarkable for a human.

Mukala

Voiced by: Eiji Fukushi (Japanese), Michael Adamthwaite (English)

, also known as Mukala of the Sun, is an African warrior who appears in the OVA Kikôtei Densetsu. He is a warrior of the Taulagi tribe and is Naria's fiancee. Mukala is also capable of fighting the Warriors without his armor. He defeated the Warriors in his first appearance and captured Ryo and Sage. He brought them to his home territory, located in Tanzania, and imprisoned them there.

It was discovered that Mukala's actions were being controlled by the Black Inferno Armor. Its powers were so great that it would destroy the world if it clashed with Ryo's Armor of Inferno. But because of Mukala's position as head warrior and the Taulagi's worship of the Armor, the villagers would not help the Warriors get rid of the Armor. Mukala realized the truth in the last episode when Naria is killed in the crossfire during his battle with Ryo. He freed himself from the Armor's possession and regained his humanity. Both Armors of Inferno were destroyed once and for all. Naria was revived and it was assumed they would marry and live happily ever after.

Mukala's weapon is a giant black boomerang with a large blue gem encrusted in its center. It is powerful enough to slice through buildings and pretty much anything that stands in his way. To equip his Armor, he shouts "Noubezaaya, Iijizuuri, Zuuamaumaa, Muunmi!" Hundreds of energy beings shaped like butterflies wrap themselves around Mukala and transform into the Black Inferno Armor.

Suzunagi

Voiced by: Mitsuki Yayoi (Japanese), Ellen Kennedy (English)

 appears in the OVA Message. She was born in the late Edo period to a Christian family, who happened to be indirect descendants of The Ancient One's Clan. Her father was a local playwright who ran a theater house, while her mother helped with theater duties. Suzunagi's father wrote a play about five young men wearing magical suits of armors fighting the forces of evil. However, due to certain circumstances (apparently due to them being Christians, or her father speaking out against the Shogun), the Shogun's samurai arrived and set the theater on fire. Suzunagi's father was executed by the samurai, while Suzunagi and her mother were killed in the fire.

Suzunagi's spirit wandered throughout the centuries, unable to rest until the armors were destroyed. She learned all she could about her father's manuscript and believed the armors were evil. She encountered The Ancient One during the 1940s (more precisely, World War II) as he prepared to unseal the Armor of Strata. Suzunagi tried to prevent the Ancient One from unsealing the Armor, but the Ancient One unsealed it anyway and used its powers to drive her off.

Years later, Suzunagi appeared again, this time as an adult with increased power and determination. She went after the Ronin Warriors, the people mentioned in her father's play, and captured them one by one by using their own deepest fears and strengths against them. She created her own set of armors to hold them captive. She wanted them to summon their ultimate armor, the White Inferno, and use its power to purge the world from pain and sorrow. Suzunagi slowly realized that they suffered because of the armors. The Warriors helped Suzunagi free herself from her inner demons and reunite her with her mother. In return, Suzunagi gave them new armors free from Talpa's influence. She also helped them realize that being Ronin Warriors was their choice, rather than their destiny.

References

Ronin Warriors

th:ซามูไรทรูปเปอร์